Pintadas is a municipality in the state of Bahia in the North-East region of Brazil.

Gallery

References

External links
https://web.archive.org/web/20071030085212/http://www.marivaldo.eti.br/
http://www.pintadas.ba.gov.br

Municipalities in Bahia